María "Maripi" de la Paz Hernández (born January 11, 1977, in Buenos Aires) is a retired field hockey player from Argentina, who won the silver medal with the national women's hockey team at the 2000 Summer Olympics in Sydney and bronze medals at the 2004 Summer Olympics in Athens and 2008 Summer Olympics in Beijing. She was also a member of the Argentinian squad that won the World Cup in 2002 and two Champions Trophy (2001 and 2008). María de la Paz has also two Pan American Games (1999 and 2003) and the Pan American Cup in 2001. Her brother is current Argentina rugby star Juan Martín Hernández.

References
 
 Profile

External links
 
 

1977 births
Living people
Argentine female field hockey players
Las Leonas players
Olympic field hockey players of Argentina
Field hockey players at the 2000 Summer Olympics
Field hockey players at the 2004 Summer Olympics
Field hockey players at the 2008 Summer Olympics
Olympic silver medalists for Argentina
Olympic bronze medalists for Argentina
Field hockey players from Buenos Aires
Olympic medalists in field hockey
Medalists at the 2000 Summer Olympics
Medalists at the 2004 Summer Olympics
Medalists at the 2008 Summer Olympics
Pan American Games gold medalists for Argentina
Pan American Games medalists in field hockey
Field hockey players at the 1999 Pan American Games
Field hockey players at the 2003 Pan American Games
Medalists at the 1999 Pan American Games
Medalists at the 2003 Pan American Games